The Silver Star is a passenger train operated by Amtrak on a  route between New York City and Miami via Washington, D.C., Richmond, Virginia, Raleigh, North Carolina, Columbia, South Carolina, Savannah, Georgia, Jacksonville, Florida, and Tampa, Florida. The Silver Star and its sister train in the Silver Service brand, the Silver Meteor, are the descendants of numerous long-distance trains that operated between Florida and New York for most of the 20th century.

During fiscal year 2019, the Silver Star carried nearly 389,995 passengers, an increase of 5.9% from FY2018. In FY16, it earned a total revenue of $29,261,496, an 11.6% decrease from FY2010.

History 

The Silver Star was originally a service of the Seaboard Air Line Railroad (SAL), running from New York to Miami and later also St. Petersburg (beyond Tampa). It was previously known as the Advance Silver Meteor, and was renamed on December 12, 1947, after the name was chosen by SAL in a contest. From 1947 to 1948, it was winter-only and did not appear in summer timetables.  By 1949, however, it was a year-round train. Its main Miami-bound route went through the interior of Florida, via Ocala and Winter Haven. In peak winter service in the mid-1950s it had a section that went to St. Petersburg via Tampa. Another section went to Port Boca Grande via Tampa. The Pennsylvania Railroad (PRR) carried the train between New York and Washington, D.C. under a haulage agreement, similar to the arrangement with its sister train, the Silver Meteor. The agreement was maintained when the PRR was folded into Penn Central Transportation in 1968, a year after SAL merged with the Atlantic Coast Line Railroad (ACL) to form the Seaboard Coast Line Railroad (SCL). Between Washington and Richmond, Virginia, the train operated on RF&P rails. Amtrak took over the train in 1971.

Amtrak era 

Except for a brief period from 1994 to 1995 and from 1996 to 2004, when service to Tampa was provided by the Palmetto (known as the Silver Palm from 1996 to 2002), the Silver Star has served both Tampa and Miami during the Amtrak era. Originally, Amtrak operated the Silver Star with Tampa and Miami sections that split in Jacksonville, with the Tampa section continuing on the old Atlantic Coast Line route through Orlando, and the Miami section traveling through Ocala and Wildwood over most of what was the original Seaboard route to Miami. The detour occurs at Lakeland; the train stops there to discharge passengers before going to Tampa and to receive passengers after it returns from Tampa.

In the January 2011 issue of Trains magazine, this route was listed as one of five routes to be looked at by Amtrak in FY 2011 as the previous five routes (the Sunset Limited, Texas Eagle, California Zephyr, Capitol Limited, and Cardinal) were examined in FY 2010. With the discontinuation of the Silver Meteor's former Tampa section (a descendant of the Champion, a longtime rival of the Silver Star and Silver Meteor) in 1988, the Silver Star is now the only passenger train serving Tampa.

On July 1, 2015, the Silver Star's dining car was completely removed from the train's consist, a controversial decision that Amtrak rationalized with the idea that sleeping car passengers could obtain meals from the train's café-lounge car. However, on May 1, 2020, the Silver Star's dining car was returned, and Amtrak introduced the “flexible dining” system to the train, which consists of pre-prepared meals which are then heated in either a convection oven or a microwave oven at the time of purchase. In a Rail Passengers Association webinar that took place on November 16, 2022, Amtrak's vice president of long-distance service revealed that traditional dining service is planned to be reintroduced on the Silver Meteor and the Silver Star "in early 2023." On March 15, 2023, traditional dining was returned to the Silver Star for the first time since 2015, on northbound train 92. Southbound train 91 received traditional dining on March 17. According to Amtrak, traditional dining is being offered on the Silver Star in the form of a 3 month pilot, intended to test how well the service works with only two dining car staff. Amtrak also stated that their final analysis of this pilot may have them "modify the service before a more formal announcement of a permanent rollout or potential expansion to the Silver Meteor” occurs.

On February 4, 2018, Silver Star train number 91 collided with a CSX freight train in Cayce, South Carolina; the engineer and a conductor of the Silver Star were killed, and 116 passengers were injured.

In 2021, Amtrak reached out to FDOT to begin negotiations again for utilization of the Miami Intermodal Center. This comes after years of disagreement over the platform length at the MIC, as Amtrak normally adds cars to the Silver Meteor and Silver Star during the winter season to accommodate increased demand. In February 2022, negotiations restarted between FDOT and Amtrak. Later in March 2022, a test train operated into and out of the station and proved that the platforms are sufficient in length to hold a standard 10 car train. However, the platforms are not long enough to accommodate an 11 to 12 car train, which could be possible in the winter months. In September 2022, Amtrak management announced that it had restarted lease negotiations with FDOT regarding use and maintenance of the terminal. One issue however, is the deadheading move that will need to take place between the MIC and Hialeah. Amtrak CEO Stephen Gardner has stated that "the company is evaluating technical and operational aspects of the move." In an Amtrak Public Board Meeting Q&A on December 1, 2022, it was revealed that Amtrak is in the final stages of its preparations for relocating from their current Miami station, and plans to officially relocate to the MIC in 2023.

COVID-19 pandemic 

On July 6, 2020, Amtrak reduced the frequency of this train to three times per week as opposed to daily.  Southbound Silver Star trains departed New York Friday through Sunday, while Silver Meteor trains departed Monday through Thursday.  Similarly, northbound Silver Star trains departed Miami on Thursday through Saturday, while Silver Meteor trains departed Sunday through Wednesday. Both trains resumed daily services on June 7, 2021, after additional Amtrak funding was included in the American Rescue Plan Act of 2021.

Between January 24th and October 14th, 2022, the Silver Star temporarily added a station stop in Jesup, Georgia due to the suspension of its sister train, the Silver Meteor, which is normally the only train that stops at that station. This was due to a resurgence of the Omicron variant of COVID-19 as well as a further delay caused by Hurricane Ian. During this period the Silver Star provided a single once daily service between New York and Miami.

Ridership

Rolling stock 

The Silver Star uses Amtrak's standard long-distance single-level equipment: Viewliner baggage cars, Viewliner sleeping cars, Viewliner dining cars, Amfleet café-lounges and Amfleet coaches. An ACS-64 electric locomotive is used between New York City and Washington, D.C, while two GE P42DC diesel electric locomotives are used for power south of Washington, D.C.

A typical Silver Star consist as of January 2023 is made up of:

 1 ACS-64 locomotive (New York–Washington)
 2 P42DC locomotive (Washington–Miami)
 3 Amfleet II Coaches
 1 Amfleet II Café/Lounge
 1 Viewliner II Diner
 2 Viewliner I/II Sleepers (Viewliner I-Viewliner II)
 1 Viewliner II Baggage Car

During the 2022 suspension of the Silver Meteor, some coach and sleeping cars usually on the Silver Meteor were combined into the Silver Star, creating a train with up to six coaches and five sleepers, in addition to the café-lounge, diner, and baggage car.

Route details 
 
The Silver Star operates over a combination of Amtrak, CSX Transportation (CSXT), and Norfolk Southern Railway (NS) trackage:
 New York – Washington D.C. (Amtrak)
 Northeast Corridor:
 Washington D.C. – Selma, North Carolina (CSXT)
 RF&P Subdivision
 Richmond Terminal Subdivision
 North End Subdivision
 South End Subdivision:
 Selma – Raleigh, North Carolina (NS)
 Goldsboro to Greensboro District
 Raleigh – DeLand, Florida (CSXT)
 Aberdeen Subdivision
 Hamlet Terminal Subdivision
 Hamlet Subdivision
 Columbia Subdivision
 Savannah Subdivision
 Nahunta Subdivision
 Jacksonville Terminal Subdivision
 Sanford Subdivision
 DeLand – Poinciana, Florida (SunRail)
 Central Florida Rail Corridor
 Poinciana – Tampa, Florida – Mangonia Park, Florida (CSXT)
 Carters Subdivision
 Lakeland Subdivision
 Tampa Terminal Subdivision
 Auburndale Subdivision
 Miami Subdivision
 Mangonia Park – Miami, Florida (Tri-Rail)
 South Florida Rail Corridor

The Silver Star uses the same route as the Silver Meteorthe other train in the Silver Service brandexcluding two segments: Selma, North Carolina – Savannah, Georgia, and Kissimmee, Florida – Winter Haven, Florida. Between Selma and Savannah, the Silver Star takes an inland route over the CSX S-Line to serve the Carolinas' state capitals of Raleigh and Columbia, while the Silver Meteor stays closer to the coast on the CSX A-Line and serves Fayetteville, North Carolina and Charleston, South Carolina. Between Kissimmee and Winter Haven, the Silver Meteor turns south to go directly to Miami at Auburndale, Florida, while the Silver Star continues west to Lakeland, Florida and Tampa, before coming back to Auburndale and turning south to Miami. In addition to these diversions, between Sebring, Florida and West Palm Beach, Florida, the Silver Meteor makes no intermediate stops, while the Silver Star makes an additional stop at Okeechobee, Florida. Inversely, between Savannah and Jacksonville, Florida, the Silver Meteor makes an additional stop at Jesup, Georgia, while the Silver Star makes no intermediate stops. However, during the 2022 suspension of the Silver Meteor, the Silver Star temporarily served Jesup.

Prior to October 1986, the Silver Star operated between Petersburg, Virginia, and Raleigh via the CSX Norlina Subdivision, stopping only in Henderson, North Carolina. CSX abandoned the Norlina Subdivision between Norlina, North Carolina and Collier Yard (just south of Petersburg) in October 1986, which required the Silver Star to be rerouted over the CSX A-Line between Petersburg and Selma, then over the North Carolina Railroad between Selma and Raleigh. The Silver Star is to be rerouted via its former routing when tracks between Petersburg and Norlina are rebuilt as part of the Southeast High Speed Rail Corridor project, and reinstate its stop at Henderson, as well as adding a stop in La Crosse, Virginia.

Like other long-distance trains operating on the Northeast Corridor, local travel between NEC stations is not allowed on the Silver Star. Northbound trains only stop to discharge passengers from Alexandria, Virginia northward, and southbound trains only stop to receive passengers from Newark, New Jersey to Washington.  This policy is in place to keep seats available for passengers making longer trips. Passengers wanting to travel locally must use the more frequent Northeast Regional or Acela trains. Additionally, the Silver Star, like the Silver Meteor, does not allow local travel between West Palm Beach and Miami. Southbound trains only stop to discharge passengers, while northbound trains only stop to receive passengers bound for points beyond West Palm Beach. This is due to the availability of Tri-Rail, South Florida's commuter rail system.

Since Amtrak ended passenger rail service over the CSX Clearwater Subdivision between Tampa and St. Petersburg, Florida in February 1984,Amtrak Thruway bus service has been provided at Tampa Union Station for trainside transfer of passengers and their baggage to and from Clearwater, Florida and St. Petersburg. Other points on Florida's west coast, such as Bradenton, Florida, Sarasota, Florida, Port Charlotte, Florida and Fort Myers, Florida, are also served by Amtrak Thruway service connecting with the Silver Star at Tampa. Similarly, Amtrak has provided Amtrak Thruway bus service between the former stations along the CSX Wildwood Subdivision in North-Central Florida since November 2004 after passenger rail service ended, as well as Gainesville, Florida and The Villages-Lady Lake, Florida. The former stations that are now served by Amtrak Thruway buses are: Waldo, Florida, Ocala, Florida, Wildwood, Florida, and Dade City, Florida. These buses connect with the Silver Star at Jacksonville and Lakeland.

Station stops

References

Notes

External links 

Amtrak routes
Passenger trains of the Seaboard Air Line Railroad
Passenger trains of the Seaboard Coast Line Railroad
Railway services introduced in 1947
Passenger rail transportation in New York (state)
Passenger rail transportation in New Jersey
Passenger rail transportation in Pennsylvania
Passenger rail transportation in Delaware
Passenger rail transportation in Maryland
Passenger rail transportation in Washington, D.C.
Passenger rail transportation in Virginia
Passenger rail transportation in North Carolina
Passenger rail transportation in South Carolina
Passenger rail transportation in Georgia (U.S. state)
Passenger rail transportation in Florida
Night trains of the United States
Long distance Amtrak routes